The West Indies cricket team toured Australia in the 1981–82 season and played three Test matches against Australia. The series was drawn 1–1.
They also played a series of first-class matches and competed in the 1981–82 World Series against Australia and Pakistan.

Test series summary

First Test

Second Test

Third Test

See also
 Frank Worrell Trophy
 1981–82 Australia Tri-Nation Series

References

External sources
 CricketArchive – tour summaries

Annual reviews
 Playfair Cricket Annual 1982
 Wisden Cricketers' Almanack 1982

Further reading
 Chris Harte, A History of Australian Cricket, Andre Deutsch, 1993

1981 in Australian cricket
1981 in West Indian cricket
1981–82 Australian cricket season
1982 in Australian cricket
1982 in West Indian cricket
International cricket competitions from 1980–81 to 1985
1981-82